Wendell Richard "Wendy" Anderson (February 1, 1933 – July 17, 2016) was an American hockey player, politician, and the 33rd governor of Minnesota, serving from January 4, 1971, to December 29, 1976. In late 1976 he resigned as governor in order to be appointed to the U.S. Senate after Senator Walter Mondale was elected Vice President of the United States. Anderson served in the Senate from December 30, 1976, to December 29, 1978. (After losing the 1978 Senate election to Rudy Boschwitz, he resigned a few days before the end of his term to give Boschwitz seniority.)

Background
Anderson was born in Saint Paul, Minnesota, in 1933. He attended Saint Paul's Johnson High School and the University of Minnesota, where he received a B.A. in 1954. He earned a law degree from the University of Minnesota Law School in 1960.

Anderson served in the United States Army from 1955 to 1957, reaching the rank of First Lieutenant. He later served with an intelligence unit in the Army Reserve.

Hockey career
Anderson played defense for the University of Minnesota from 1951 to 1954, and was a member of the U.S. hockey team that won a silver medal at the 1956 Winter Olympics. Long after his on-ice career ended, he was drafted by the Minnesota Fighting Saints in the inaugural World Hockey Association draft of 1972, in what was seen as a publicity stunt. (Not to be outdone, another WHA team selected Soviet Premier Alexei Kosygin.) While flattered, Anderson chose to remain governor.

Political career

Anderson served in the Minnesota House of Representatives from 1959 to 1962 and in the Minnesota State Senate from 1963 to 1970. He was elected governor of Minnesota in 1970. His signature accomplishment as governor was helping to create the "Minnesota Miracle of 1971", an innovative reform in financing of Minnesota public schools and local governments that created a fairer distribution in taxation and education. For his efforts Anderson was featured on a 1973 cover of Time magazine.

After U.S. Senator Walter Mondale was elected vice president in 1976, the governor had to appoint Mondale's successor. Anderson agreed with his lieutenant governor, Rudy Perpich, that Anderson would resign as governor, and Perpich, as the new governor, would appoint Anderson to the Senate.

In what became known as the "Minnesota Massacre", nearly the entire DFL Party ticket was defeated in 1978, including Perpich and the candidates for both U.S. Senate seats, Anderson and Bob Short. Anderson's arrangement to have himself appointed to the Senate—and Perpich's role in that appointment—were deemed central factors in the defeats.

From 1995 to 2001 Anderson served as a director for and head of the legal committee of Turbodyne Technologies Inc. (TRBD) in Carpinteria, California. In his later years he was regularly called upon to act as a commentator on Minnesota politics for local stations such as KSTP-TV.

Personal life
Anderson married Mary Christine McKee (1939-2018) of Bemidji, Minnesota, in 1963. They had three children: Amy, Elizabeth, and Brett. They divorced in 1990.

In the 1970s, Anderson appeared on the TV game show "What's My Line?" A panel consisting of Gene Rayburn, Arlene Francis, Gene Shalit and Sheila MacRae was unable to guess that he was the governor of Minnesota.

In 1975, two of the Swedish District lodges of the Vasa Order of America selected Anderson as Swedish-American of the Year.

Anderson died on July 17, 2016, of complications of Alzheimer's disease. He was 83.

References

External links 

Wendell Anderson on the cover of TIME magazine: August 13, 1973

|-

|-

|-

|-

1933 births
2016 deaths
Politicians from Saint Paul, Minnesota
Ice hockey people from Saint Paul, Minnesota
Lutherans from Minnesota
Democratic Party United States senators from Minnesota
Democratic Party governors of Minnesota
Democratic Party members of the Minnesota House of Representatives
Democratic Party Minnesota state senators
American men's ice hockey defensemen
Minnesota Golden Gophers men's ice hockey players
Ice hockey players at the 1956 Winter Olympics
American athlete-politicians
20th-century Lutherans
20th-century American politicians
University of Minnesota Law School alumni
United States Army officers
Military personnel from Minnesota
Medalists at the 1956 Winter Olympics
Olympic silver medalists for the United States in ice hockey